Euphiuche apoblepta is a species of moth of the family Erebidae first described by Turner in 1908. It is known from the Australian state of Queensland.

References

Hypeninae
Moths of Australia